Doyle Township is a township in Marion County, Kansas, United States.  As of the 2010 census, the township population was 60, not including the city of Florence. Doyle was first settled by Euro-Americans in 1858.

Geography

Cities and towns
The township contains the following settlements:
 City of Florence (east part).  The west part of Florence is located in Fairplay Township.
 Ghost town of Hampson.

Cemeteries
The township contains the following cemeteries:
 Florence City Cemetery (aka Hillcrest Cemetery), located in Section 6 T21S R5E.

Transportation
U.S. Route 50 and U.S. Route 77 pass through the township.

References

Further reading

External links
 Marion County website
 City-Data.com
 Marion County maps: Current, Historic, KDOT

Townships in Marion County, Kansas
Townships in Kansas
1858 establishments in Kansas Territory